The 2011 FIBA Africa Under-16 Championship for Men (alternatively the Afrobasket U16) was the 2nd U-16 FIBA Africa championship, played under the auspices of the Fédération Internationale de Basketball, the basketball sport governing body and qualified for the 2012 World Cup. The tournament was held from July 8–16 in Alexandria, Egypt, contested by 8 national teams and won by Egypt.

The tournament qualified the winner for the 2012 U17 World Championship.

Squads

Format
The 8 teams were divided into two groups (Groups A+B) for the preliminary round.
Round robin for the preliminary round.
From there on a knockout system was used until the final.

Draw

Preliminary round
Times given below are in UTC+2.

Group A

Group B

Knockout stage 
All matches were played in: Alexandria

5th place bracket

Quarterfinals

Classification 5–8

Semifinals

Seventh place game

Fifth place game

Bronze medal game

Gold medal game

Final standings

Egypt rosterAhmed Elsayed, Ahmed Elmoslly, Ahmed Soliman, Amr Nabil, Anas Mahmoud, Ehab Amin, Moataz Hosny, Omar Abdeen, Omar Elmanestrly, Walid Aly, Wessam Emad, Ziad Nabil, Coach: Youssef Rafik

Awards

All-Tournament Team

 G Ehab Amin MVP
 PG Omar Abdeen
 F Ahmed Boutiba
 PF Wessam Emad
 C Helton Ubisse

See also
 2012 FIBA Africa Under-18 Championship

External links
Official Website

References

2011
Under-16 Championship
2011 in Malagasy sport
International basketball competitions hosted by Egypt